Daniel Hamilton Sneddon Liddle (17 February 1912 – 9 June 1982) was a Scottish footballer, who played for East Fife, Leicester City, Mansfield Town and Scotland.

References

External links

1912 births
1982 deaths
Scottish footballers
Scotland international footballers
East Fife F.C. players
Leicester City F.C. players
Mansfield Town F.C. players
Scottish Football League players
English Football League players
Association football fullbacks
Stamford A.F.C. players
People from Bo'ness
Association football forwards
Scottish Junior Football Association players
Scotland junior international footballers